Gaston Baty (26 May 1885 – 13 October 1952), whose full name was Jean-Baptiste-Marie-Gaston Baty, was a French playwright and theatre director. He was born in Pélussin, Loire, France.

Career 
In 1921, Baty formed his own company Les Compagnons de la Chimère [The Companions of the Chimera],:157 which mounted productions in a variety of Parisian theatres in the 1920s and 30s.:2 He was also a member of Le Cartel des Quatre [The Cartel of Four], a group of four directors in Paris who offered an alternative to both "academic and commercial theatre".:178 His stage adaptation of Gustave Flaubert's Madame Bovary was presented in an English translation on Broadway in 1937. Constance Cummings played the title role.  Baty is also the author of a play entitled Dulcinea, which has been filmed twice and produced on television in 1989. It is an original play that takes its inspiration from Miguel de Cervantes's great novel Don Quixote and uses some of its characters. The second film version, made in 1963, starred Millie Perkins as Dulcinea, and was released in the U.S. as The Girl from La Mancha. He wrote Vie de l'art théatral, des origines a nos jours in 1932 with René Chavance.

Theater director 
 1919: La Grande Pastorale by Charles Hellem and Pol d'Estoc, Cirque d'hiver

1920–1929 

1920: Les Esclaves by Saint-Georges de Bouhélier, Théâtre des Arts
1920: Le Simoun by Henri-René Lenormand, Comédie Montaigne
1921: L'Avare by Molière, Comédie Montaigne
1921: 29 degrés à l'ombre by Eugène Labiche, Comédie Montaigne
1921: Les Amants puérils by Fernand Crommelynck, Comédie Montaigne
1921: Le Héros et le soldat by George Bernard Shaw, Comédie Montaigne
1921: L'annonce faite à Marie by Paul Claudel, Comédie Montaigne
1921: Haya by Herman Grégoire, Comédie des Champs-Élysées
1921: La Belle de Haguenau by Jean Variot, Comédie des Champs-Élysées
1922: Césaire by Jean Schlumberger, Comédie des Champs-Élysées
1922: La Farce de Popa Ghéorghé by Adolphe Orna, Théâtre des Mathurins
1922: Martine by Jean-Jacques Bernard, Théâtre des Mathurins
1922: Intimité by Jean-Victor Pellerin, Théâtre des Mathurins
1922: Le Voyageur by Denys Amiel, Baraque de la Chimère, Saint-Germain-en-Laye
1922: Je veux revoir ma Normandie by Lucien Besnard, Baraque de la Chimère, Saint-Germain-en-Laye
1922: Cyclone by Simon Gantillon, Baraque de la Chimère, Saint-Germain-en-Laye
1922: L'Aube et le soir de Sainte-Geneviève by Marie Diemer, Baraque de la Chimère, Saint-Germain-en-Laye
1923: La Souriante Madame Beudet by Denys Amiel and André Obey, Théâtre de l'Odéon
1923: The Emperor Jones by Eugene O'Neill, Théâtre de l'Odéon
1923: Le Voile du souvenir by Henri Turpin and Pierre-Paul Fournier, Théâtre de l'Odéon
1924: L'Invitation au voyage by Jean-Jacques Bernard, Théâtre de l'Odéon
1924: Le Fardeau de la liberté by Tristan Bernard, Théâtre de l'Odéon
1924: Alphonsine by Paul Haurigot, Théâtre du Vaudeville
1924: Parades by Thomas Gueullette, Studio des Champs-Élysées
1924: Maya by Simon Gantillon, Studio des Champs-Élysées
1924: À l'ombre du mal by Henri-René Lenormand, Studio des Champs-Élysées
1925: Miss Julie by August Strindberg, Studio des Champs-Élysées
1925: Déjeuner d'artistes by Jean Gaument and Camille Cé, Studio des Champs-Élysées
1925: L'Étrange Épouse du professeur Stierbecke by Albert-Jean, Studio des Champs-Élysées
1925: La Cavalière Elsa by Paul Demasy after Pierre Mac Orlan
1925: La Chapelle ardente by Gabriel Marcel, Théâtre du Vieux-Colombier
1925: Fantaisie amoureuse by André Lang, Théâtre du Vieux-Colombier
1926: Le Dompteur ou l'anglais tel qu'on le mange by Alfred Savoir, Théâtre Michel
1926: Le Couvre-feu by Albert Boussac de Saint-Marc, Studio des Champs-Élysées
1926: L'Homme du destin by George Bernard Shaw, Studio des Champs-Élysées
1926: Le Bourgeois romanesque by Jean Blanchon, Studio des Champs-Élysées
1926: Une visite by Anne Valray, Studio des Champs-Élysées
1926: Têtes de rechange by Jean-Victor Pellerin, Studio des Champs-Élysées
1926: Les Chevaux du char by Jacques de Zogher, Théâtre Antoine
1926: L'Amour magicien by Henri-René Lenormand, Studio des Champs-Élysées
1927: Almicar by Philippe Fauré-Frémiet, Studio des Champs-Élysées
1927: La Machine à calculer by Elmer Rice, Studio des Champs-Élysées
1928: The Dybbuk by S. Ansky, Studio des Champs-Élysées
1928: Cris des cœurs by Jean-Victor Pellerin, Théâtre de l'Avenue
1928: Le Premier Hamlet by Shakespeare, Théâtre de l'Avenue
1928: Départ by Simon Gantillon, Théâtre de l'Avenue
1929: Le Malade imaginaire by Molière, Théâtre de l'Avenue
1929: La Voix de sa maîtresse by Charles Oulmont and Paul Masson, Théâtre de l'Avenue
1929: Karl et Anna by Leonhard Frank, Théâtre de l'Avenue

1930–1939 
1930: Feu du ciel by  Pierre Dominique, Théâtre Pigalle
1930: Le Simoun by Henri-René Lenormand, Théâtre Pigalle
1930: The Threepenny Opera by Bertolt Brecht, Théâtre Montparnasse
1930: Le Médecin malgré lui by Molière, Théâtre Montparnasse
1930: Le Sourd ou l'auberge pleine by Pierre Jean Baptiste Choudard Desforges, Théâtre Montparnasse
1931: Terrain vague by Jean-Victor Pellerin, Théâtre Montparnasse
1931: Beau Danube rouge by Bernard Zimmer, Théâtre Montparnasse
1932: Bifur by Simon Gantillon, Théâtre Montparnasse
1932: Café-Tabac by Denys Amiel, Théâtre Montparnasse
1932: As You Desire Me  by Luigi Pirandello, Théâtre Montparnasse
1933: Crime and punishment after Dostoievsky, Théâtre Montparnasse
1934: Voyage circulaire by Jacques Chabannes, Théâtre Montparnasse
1934: Prosper by Lucienne Favre, Théâtre Montparnasse
1935: Hôtel des masques by Albert-Jean, Théâtre Montparnasse
1935: Les Caprices de Marianne by Alfred de Musset, Théâtre Montparnasse
1936: Madame Bovary after Gustave Flaubert, Théâtre Montparnasse
1937: Les Ratés by Henri-René Lenormand, Théâtre Montparnasse
1937: Faust by Goethe, Théâtre Montparnasse
1937: Le Chandelier by Alfred de Musset, Comédie-Française
1937: Madame Capet by Marcelle Maurette, Théâtre Montparnasse
1938: The Italian Straw Hat by Eugène Labiche and Marc-Michel, Comédie-Française
1938: Arden de Feversham by Henri-René Lenormand, Théâtre Montparnasse
1938: Dulcinée by Gaston Baty, Théâtre Montparnasse
1939: Manon Lescaut by Marcelle Maurette after abbé Prévost, Théâtre Montparnasse

1940–1949 
1940: Phèdre by Jean Racine, Théâtre Montparnasse
1940: Un garçon de chez Véry by Eugène Labiche, Théâtre Montparnasse
1941: Marie Stuart by Marcelle Maurette, Théâtre Montparnasse
1941: The Taming of the Shrew by Shakespeare, Théâtre Montparnasse
1942: Macbeth by Shakespeare, Théâtre Montparnasse
1944: Le Grand Poucet by Claude-André Puget, Théâtre Montparnasse
1944: La Queue de la poële by Gaston Baty, Marionnettes de Gaston Baty
1944: Emily Brontë by Madame Simone, Théâtre Montparnasse
1945: Lorenzaccio by Alfred de Musset, Théâtre Montparnasse
1946: Berenice by Racine, Comédie-Française
1946: Arlequin poli par l'amour by Marivaux, Comédie-Française
1947: * L'Amour des trois oranges by Alexandre Arnoux, Théâtre Montparnasse
1948: Sapho by Alphonse Daudet and Auguste Bélot, Comédie-Française
1948: La Langue des femmes by Jean-Baptiste Marie and La Marjolaine by Gaston Baty, puppets by Gaston Baty, Salle des Archives Internationales de la danse
1948: Au temps où Berthe filait by Marcel Fabry, puppets by Gaston Baty, Salle des Archives Internationales de la danse
1949: L'Inconnue d'Arras by Armand Salacrou, Comédie-Française
1949: La Tragique Et Plaisante Histoire du Docteur Faust by Gaston Baty, puppets by Gaston Baty

 1950–1959 
1952: Les Caprices de Marianne by Alfred de Musset, Comédie de Provence Casino municipal in Aix-en-Provence
1952: Phèdre by Jean Racine, Comédie de Provence Casino municipal in Aix-en-Provence
1952: Le Médecin malgré lui by Molière, Comédie de Provence Casino municipal in Aix-en-Provence
1952: Arden de Feversham by Henri-René Lenormand, Comédie de Provence Casino municipal in Aix-en-Provence
1953: Le Chandelier by Alfred de Musset, Comédie de Provence Théâtre du Gymnase (Marseille)
1957: Faust'' by Goethe, Théâtre Montparnasse

References

External links 
 Fonds Gaston Baty on Bnf Archives et manuscrits.

1885 births
1952 deaths
People from Loire (department)
20th-century French dramatists and playwrights